Phillippe is both a given name and a surname. Notable people with the name include:

People with the given name Phillippe 
 Phillippe Aumont (born 1989), Canadian baseball player
 Phillippe de Longvilliers de Poincy (1583–1660), French nobleman
 Phillippe de Oliveira (died 1627), Portuguese colonial governor
 Phillippe Édouard Léon van Tieghem (1839–1914), French botanist

People with the surname Phillippe 
 Deacon Phillippe (1872–1952), Major League Baseball pitcher
 Ryan Phillippe (born 1974), American actor

See also
 Philip (disambiguation)
 Philips (disambiguation)
 Philipps (disambiguation)
 Phillips (disambiguation)
 Phillipps

French masculine given names